String Quartet No. 2 may refer to:

 String Quartet No. 2 (Babbitt) by Milton Babbitt
 String Quartet No. 2 (Bartók) by Béla Bartók
 String Quartet No. 2 (Beethoven) by Ludwig van Beethoven
 String Quartet No. 2 (Bois), Pastorale V by Rob du Bois
 String Quartet No. 2 (Borodin) by Alexander Borodin
 String Quartet No. 2 (Brahms) by Johannes Brahms
 String Quartet No. 2 (Bridge) by Frank Bridge
 String Quartet No. 2 (Britten) by Benjamin Britten
 String Quartet No. 2 (Carter) by Elliott Carter
 String Quartet No. 2 (Diamond) by David Diamond
 String Quartet No. 2 (Dvořák) by Antonín Dvořák
 String Quartet No. 2 (Enescu) by George Enescu
 String Quartet No. 2 (Ferneyhough) by Brian Ferneyhough
 String Quartet No. 2 (Glass) by Philip Glass
 String Quartet No. 2 (Haas), From the Monkey Mountains by Pavel Haas
 String Quartet No. 2 (Halffter) Mémoires by Cristóbal Halffter
 String Quartet No. 2 (Haydn) by Joseph Haydn
 String Quartet No. 2 (Hill) by Alfred Hill
 String Quartet No. 2 (Janáček), Intimate Letters by Leoš Janáček
 String Quartet No. 2 (Kernis) by Aaron Jay Kernis
 String Quartet No. 2 (Kirchner) by Leon Kirchner
 String Quartet No. 2 (Ligeti) by György Ligeti
 String Quartet No. 2 (McCabe) by John McCabe
 String Quartet No. 2 (Marco), Espejo desierto by Tomás Marco
 String Quartet No. 2 (Mendelssohn) by Felix Mendelssohn
 String Quartet No. 2 (Milhaud), Op. 16, by Darius Milhaud
 String Quartet No. 2 (Mozart) by Wolfgang Amadeus Mozart
 String Quartet No. 2 (Nielsen) by Carl Nielsen
 String Quartet No. 2 (Maconchy) by Elizabeth Maconchy
 String Quartet No. 2 (Oswald) by Henrique Oswald
 String Quartet No. 2 (Persichetti), Op. 24, by Vincent Persichetti
 String Quartet No. 2 (Piston) by Walter Piston
 String Quartet No. 2 (Porter) by Quincy Porter
 String Quartet No. 2 (Prokofiev) by Sergei Prokofiev
 String Quartet No. 2 (Revueltas), Magueyes by Silvestre Revueltas
 String Quartet No. 2 (Rihm) by Wolfgang Rihm
 String Quartet No. 2 (Rouse) by Christopher Rouse
 String Quartet No. 2 (Schoenberg) by Arnold Schoenberg
 String Quartet No. 2 (Schubert) by Franz Schubert
 String Quartet No. 2 (Shostakovich) by Dmitri Shostakovich
 String Quartet No. 2 (Smetana) by Bedřich Smetana
 String Quartet No. 2 (Tchaikovsky) by Pyotr Ilyich Tchaikovsky
 String Quartet No. 2 (Tippett) by Michael Tippett
 String Quartet No. 2 (Villa-Lobos) by Heitor Villa-Lobos